Tamo gdje ljubav počinje is the fourth studio album from the Sarajevo-based Bosnian pop rock band Crvena Jabuka, released in 1989.

This album is mostly centered on love songs, and had six singles. After the release of this album there was a tour that lasted to near the start of 1990. The most significant concert was at the Zagreb Sports Arena, where Crvena Jabuka recorded their first live album Uzmi me (kad hoćeš ti).

This album features the band in its concert lineup at that time, and it was the first album to be produced by Nikša Bratoš.

Track listing
All songs are written by Zlatko Arslanagić:

To mi radi
Tuga ti i ja
Nek' vrijeme mijenja se
Volio bih da si tu
Šetajući daljinama
Čarolija (kad prestane)
Riznice sjećanja
Ostani
Na oluje navikli smo
Ne dam da ovaj osjećaj ode
Ples nevjernih godina
Tamo gdje ljubav počinje

Personnel
Darko Jelčić: drums, percussion
Dražen Žerić: main vocals
Zlatko Arslanagić: rhythm guitar
Zlatko Volarević: piano
Branko Salka: bass guitar
Nikša Bratoš: guitar, horn arrangements on 6

References

1989 albums
Crvena jabuka albums
Jugoton albums